WVIP is a radio station licensed to New Rochelle, New York and serving the New York metropolitan area. WVIP features a Caribbean music format airing programming for the Afro-Caribbean community.  Its studios are in New Rochelle, and its transmitter is located in Yonkers, New York.

Historically, WVIP was an AM station in Mt. Kisco NY.  Founded in 1957, it operated on 1310 kHz with a power of 5000w. The station was destroyed by fire in 1997. (cf. "The Airwaves of New York", McFarland & Company, Inc. Publishers) (For more details, see "WRVP" per above.)

HD programming
On July 12, 2010, WVIP began broadcasting in HD.

The HD2 sub-channel broadcasts its sister AM station, WVOX.

References

External links 

 The record is incomplete due to FCC error, starting in 1974.

VIP
Mass media in New Rochelle, New York
Caribbean-American culture in New York (state)
1948 establishments in New York (state)
Radio stations established in 1948